WGIR-FM (101.1 MHz) is a commercial radio station in Manchester, New Hampshire, airing a mainstream rock radio format, branded as Rock 101.  The station serves the Merrimack Valley area (including Concord and Nashua), and is owned by iHeartMedia, Inc., America's largest owner of radio stations.  According to Nielsen Audio, WGIR-FM is usually the #2 rated radio station in the Manchester radio market behind 95.7 WZID.  Weekdays begin with the comedy radio show Greg and the Morning Buzz, hosted by Greg Kretschmar.  It is shared with co-owned 100.3 WHEB in Portsmouth, and also heard on 104.9 WLKZ in Wolfeboro.  The rest of the day, local DJs are heard.  On Sunday nights, WGIR-FM carries the syndicated radio show The House of Hair with Dee Snider.

WGIR-FM's studios and offices are on Foundry Street in Manchester.  The transmitter is on Mount Uncanoonuc, off Perimeter Road in Goffstown, near other towers serving Southern New Hampshire TV and FM stations.

Following the demise of WAAF (107.3 FM) with its sale to the Educational Media Foundation, WGIR-FM has gained listenership in the northern parts of Greater Boston and Worcester County, Massachusetts, alongside Providence, Rhode Island sister station WHJY (94.1 FM), though WHJY has a clearer signal in much of the Boston area compared to WGIR-FM's signal.

History
On June 5, 1963, WGIR-FM first signed on, under the ownership of Knight Quality Stations, Inc.  At first, it simulcast co-owned AM 610 WGIR with a mix of middle of the road music, talk and information, including NBC Radio News.  It was powered at 5,000 watts, less than half its current output.

The 1970s saw WGIR-FM adopt a soft rock format including artists such as Fleetwood Mac, Linda Ronstadt, James Taylor and Carole King.  In 1979, the station began calling itself "Rock 101".  WGIR-FM's sound evolved into a more mainstream album-oriented rock format.  The power was increased to 9,600 watts.

From the 1990s to the early 2000s, WGIR-FM played mostly classic rock.  Saturdays and Sundays featured "Block Party Weekends" where three songs were played in a row from the same rock artist.  In 1997, WGIR-AM-FM were purchased by the Capstar Corporation, which was later acquired by Clear Channel Communications, the forerunner to current owner iHeartMedia.

In the early 2000s, the station moved to a harder-edged rock format featuring current and past rock acts. By 2005, the station had moved to a more contemporary rock format,  After a few years, the playlist once again included a good number of rock artists from past years, including Led Zeppelin, Van Halen, Aerosmith and Ozzy Osbourne. WGIR-FM was part of the Motor Racing Network and would broadcast NASCAR races; the station dropped MRN after the 2017 season.

References

External links

Greg and the Morning Buzz

GIR-FM
Manchester, New Hampshire
Hillsborough County, New Hampshire
Radio stations established in 1963
Mainstream rock radio stations in the United States
1963 establishments in New Hampshire
IHeartMedia radio stations